For roads named A21 see ; List of A21 roads
Route 21, or Highway 21, can refer to:

International
 European route E21

Australia
 Chandler Highway
 Toowoomba Connection Road (QLD)
 - Kakadu Highway

Austria
 Wiener Außenring Autobahn

Cambodia
National Road 21 (Cambodia)

Canada
 Alberta Highway 21
 British Columbia Highway 21
 Manitoba Highway 21
 Newfoundland and Labrador Route 21
 Ontario Highway 21
 Prince Edward Island Route 21
 Saskatchewan Highway 21

Costa Rica
 National Route 21

Czech Republic
 I/21 Highway; Czech: Silnice I/21

Hungary
 Main road 21 (Hungary)

India
  National Highway 21 (India)

Iran
 Road 21

Ireland
  N21 road (Ireland)

Italy
 Autostrada A21

Japan
 Japan National Route 21

Korea, South
 National Route 21

Moldova
 M21 highway (Moldova)

New Zealand
 New Zealand State Highway 21

Paraguay
 National Route 21

Turkey
  , a motorway in Turkey running from Kemerhisar, Niğde Province to Tarsus, Mersin Province.

United Kingdom
 British A21 (Hastings-London)
 A21 road (Northern Ireland)

United States
 U.S. Route 21
 Alabama State Route 21
 Arkansas Highway 21
 Arkansas Highway 21E (former)
 Arkansas Highway 21W (former)
 California State Route 21 (former)
 County Route A21 (California)
 County Route E21 (California)
 County Route G21 (California)
 County Route J21 (California)
 County Route S21 (California)
 Colorado State Highway 21
 Connecticut Route 21
 Florida State Road 21
 County Road 21B (Clay County, Florida)
 County Road 21B (Duval County, Florida)
 County Road 21D (Duval County, Florida)
 County Road 21 (Marion County, Florida)
 County Road 21 (Putnam County, Florida)
 Georgia State Route 21
 Hawaii Route 21 (former)
 Idaho State Highway 21
 Illinois Route 21
 Indiana State Road 21 (former)
 Iowa Highway 21
 Kentucky Route 21
 Louisiana Highway 21
 Maryland Route 21
 Massachusetts Route 21
 M-21 (Michigan highway)
 Minnesota State Highway 21
 County Road 21 (Anoka County, Minnesota)
 County Road 21 (Hennepin County, Minnesota)
 County Road 21 (Scott County, Minnesota)
 Mississippi Highway 21
 Missouri Route 21
 Montana Highway 21
 Nebraska Highway 21
 Nebraska Spur 21B
 Nebraska Spur 21C
 Nevada State Route 21 (former)
 New Jersey Route 21
 County Route C21 (Bergen County, New Jersey)
 County Route 21 (Monmouth County, New Jersey)
 New Mexico State Road 21
 New York State Route 21
 County Route 21 (Allegany County, New York)
 County Route 21 (Chautauqua County, New York)
 County Route 21 (Columbia County, New York)
 County Route 21B (Columbia County, New York)
 County Route 21C (Columbia County, New York)
 County Route 21 (Delaware County, New York)
 County Route 21 (Dutchess County, New York)
 County Route 21 (Erie County, New York)
 County Route 21 (Essex County, New York)
 County Route 21 (Genesee County, New York)
 County Route 21 (Hamilton County, New York)
 County Route 21 (Herkimer County, New York)
 County Route 21 (Lewis County, New York)
 County Route 21 (Oneida County, New York)
 County Route 21 (Ontario County, New York)
 County Route 21 (Orange County, New York)
 County Route 21 (Oswego County, New York)
 County Route 21 (Otsego County, New York)
 County Route 21 (Putnam County, New York)
 County Route 21 (Rensselaer County, New York)
 County Route 21 (Saratoga County, New York)
 County Route 21 (Schoharie County, New York)
 County Route 21 (Suffolk County, New York)
 County Route 21 (Sullivan County, New York)
 County Route 21 (Ulster County, New York)
 County Route 21 (Washington County, New York)
 County Route 21 (Westchester County, New York)
 County Route 21 (Wyoming County, New York)
 County Route 21 (Yates County, New York)
 North Carolina Highway 21 (former)
 North Dakota Highway 21
 Ohio State Route 21
 Pennsylvania Route 21
 South Carolina Highway 21 (1920s) (former)
 South Dakota Highway 21
 Tennessee State Route 21
 Texas State Highway 21
 Texas State Highway Loop 21
 Farm to Market Road 21
 Texas Park Road 21
 Utah State Route 21
 State Route 21 (Virginia 1918-1933) (former)
 Washington State Route 21
 Primary State Highway 21 (Washington) (former)
 Secondary State Highway 21B (Washington) (former)
 Secondary State Highway 21C (Washington) (former)
 County Route 21 (Jackson County, West Virginia)
 County Route 21 (Kanawha County, West Virginia)
 County Route 21 (Wirt County, West Virginia)
 County Route 21 (Wood County, West Virginia)
 Wisconsin Highway 21

Territories
 Puerto Rico Highway 21

See also
List of A21 roads
List of highways numbered 21A